Henry Ellsworth Vines Jr. (September 28, 1911 – March 17, 1994) was an American tennis champion of the 1930s, the World No. 1 player or the co-No. 1 in 1932, 1934, 1935, 1936 and 1937, able to win Pro Slam titles on three different surfaces. He later became a professional golfer and reached the semifinals of the PGA Championship in 1951.

Career

Amateur
Vines attended the University of Southern California in Los Angeles, California, where he was a member  of the Sigma Nu Fraternity and played on the freshman basketball team. Many believe that Mercer Beasley started him on his tennis career at age 14 in Pasadena. He was mentored by Perry T. Jones through the Los Angeles Tennis Club and the Southern California Tennis Association.

1927 
Vines, aged 15, reached the quarter finals of the Pacific Northwest Championships in Tacoma in July, where he lost to Dick Stevens.

In September Vines lost in the last 16 of the California state championships to Bowie Dietrick. "Vines had the first set, 5-3, on his own service, but was unable to sustain the pace against his able and more experienced opponent, and lost the first set, 8-10. He seemed pretty well tried out by that time, and Dietrick put the second set away at 6-2".

1928
Vines reached the quarter finals of the Pacific Southwest tournament in October, where he lost to Christian Boussus. "Vines forced Boussus to the limit in their match. The young Pasadenan's service was far better than that of Boussus, but the Frenchman's marvelous placements and his steadiness brought him through victoriously. He usually was content to hit the ball back, without trying fancy shots, and forced Vines into errors in long rallies."

1929
In July, Vines lost in the final of the Western Championships in Chicago to Keith Gledhill.
At the Wisconsin Championships in Milwaukee in August, Vines lost to Gledhill in the final.

1930 
In February, Vines beat Lester Stoefen in the final of the Los  Angeles championships.
In May, Vines won the Southern California championships beating Gledhill in the final. In June, Vines won the Pasadena championships, beating Stoefen in the final. In July, Vines beat Frank Hunter in the final of the New York Metropolitan championships. In September, Vines won the Pacific Southwest championships, beating Wilmer Allison in five sets in the quarters and Gregory Mangin in the final.

1931
Vines won his first title of the year in February, beating Stoefen in five sets to win the Los Angeles championships. Vines won the River Oaks tournament in Houston in April beating Bruce Barnes in the final. "Vines's service had so much pace that at times today it almost knocked the racquet from Barnes's hand." Vines won the Ojai valley championships in April over Stoefen. In May, Vines won the Southern Californian championships beating Alan Herrington in the final. "The flashiness of Vines's playing is shown in the fact that he scored forty placement aces to Herrington's three during the four sets. Vines also led in practically every other department of the game." Vines won the California State championships in June beating Ed Chandler in the final. In July, Vines won the U. S. clay court championships in St. Louis beating Gledhill in the final. and the same month won the Longwood Bowl in Brookline, Mass. over John Doeg. Then at the Seabright tournament, Vines came from two sets down to beat Doeg in the final. "The turning point of the match came in the tenth game of the fourth set. At this stage Doeg was leading five to four in games and won the first two points from Vines' service in the tenth. Employing his powerful backhand stroke, the Pasadena youngster pulled the match out of the fire by winning the next four points to take the game." In August, Vines beat Fred Perry in the final of the Newport Casino tournament. Vines was still 19 when he won his first Grand Slam singles title, the  U.S. Championships, beating George Lott in the final in four sets.  Vines played "erratically throughout the major part of match, but his brilliant placements and cannonball service were sufficient to overcome Lott's steadier volleying and effective service", according to The Daily News (New York). Trailing 5–2 in the fourth set, Vines won five consecutive games to close out the match. In September Vines beat Perry in the final of the Pacific Southwest championships in five sets. "Vines served the almost unbelievable total of twenty-three double faults during the match. When he finally got going, he didn't score many aces, but he was getting his first ball in regularly, and although the Englishman, who battled furiously to the finish, usually managed to get his racket on the ball, he couldn't handle the serve at all. Perry covered the court brilliantly, making many seemingly impossible gets." In October, Vines beat Perry again in the final of the Pacific coast championships.

1932
In April, Vines beat Allison in the final of the Mason-Dixon tournament in White Sulphur Springs. At Wimbledon Championships, Vines beat Bunny Austin easily in the final and the winning ace was hit so hard, Austin claimed he couldn't see it. Vines beat Allison in the final of the Newport Casino event in August. At the U.S. Championships, Vines beat Cliff Sutter in the semi finals in five long sets when he came very close to defeat. He then beat Henri Cochet in the final to retain his title. In November Vines beat Allison in five sets in the final of the New South Wales championships. Vines was ranked World No. 1 amateur by A. Wallis Myers, Bernard Brown, Pierre Gillou, F. Gordon Lowe and Jean Borotra.

1933
1933 was a poor year for Vines.  One of his most surprising losses was to young Australian player Vivian McGrath in the Australian championships quarter finals. Vines won the Ojai Valley championships in April beating Gledhill in the final. Vines reached the final of Wimbledon, but lost a classic five set battle to Jack Crawford. It was a "Wimbledon final that produced some of the greatest tennis in the history of the world famous tournament" and "the crowd gave Crawford one of the longest, wildest cheers that ever has echoed through Wimbledon".  At the US Championships, Vines lost in the fourth round to Bryan Grant.

Professional
1934
Vines played his first professional tennis match on January 10, 1934 and then became the leading pro player until 1938 (and the World No. 1 or No. 2 in the combined amateur-professional rankings). In his first World series tour, Vines overcame the 41 year old Bill Tilden.  From May to June, Vines participated in the US tournament circuit.  Vines won tournaments at New York, Philadelphia, Boston and Cleveland, beating Tilden in each of these events.  Then Vines lost in the semi finals at Detroit to Karel Kozeluh and didn't play in the remaining events of the tour at Milwaukee and St. Louis.  At the US Pro in Chicago, Vines lost surprisingly in the semi finals to Hans Nusslein.  At Wembley, Vines won the title in a round robin that also featured Nusslein, Tilden, Martin Plaa, Bruce Barnes and Dan Maskell.  Then Vines won in the Parc de expositions tournament in Paris beating Nusslein in the final. In December, Vines beat Tilden in the final of the Roubaix tournament. Vines was ranked World No. 1 pro by Ray Bowers and was ranked No. 1 in combined pro/amateur lists by Pierre Gillou and Tennis (Italian newspaper).

1935
Vines beat Lester Stoefen in the World series (after a disastrous start to the tour, Stoefen withdrew from the tour).  At the French Pro at Roland Garros, Vines beat Nusslein in the final. Vines then won the tournament at Southport beating Tilden.  Vines then won tournaments at Deauville and La Baule (also over Tilden).  However, he surprisingly lost to Robert Ramillon at a tournament at Le Touquet.  At Wembley, Vines trailed Stoefen 4–1 in the fifth set in the semi finals but won in five sets and beat Tilden in five sets in the final. Vines was ranked World No. 1 pro by Bowers and no. 1 in a combined amateur/pro list by Henri Cochet.

1936
Over the next three years, Vines concentrated on playing tours and did not enter tournaments.  He beat Stoefen to win the 1936 World series.  In November, he toured Asia with Tilden and won the tour easily. Vines was ranked World No. 1 pro by Bowers and Fred Perry. Vines was also ranked combined pro/amateur World No. 1 by Bill Tilden and Robert Murray(Sports Illustrated).

1937
1937 featured the first of the Vines-Perry World Series tours.  1937 was a very successful tour, grossing $412,000. The result was still in doubt until the penultimate match, when Vines beat Perry at Hershey.  Vines then won the final match of the series at Scranton to win the series 32–29.  Touring UK and Ireland, Perry won a short series against Vines, including winning two of the three matches at Wembley, where they played for the King George VI Coronation Cup. Perry and Vines were ranked joint no. 1 pros by Bowers.

1938
The 1938 World Series was another tough battle. After coming back from four match points down to win at Richmond on 8 May, Vines said "I've got a good lead over that guy (Perry) and I'm going to keep it just to prove once and for all who's No 1 man" and "if Budge turns pro next year I want to be the one to play against him because that's where the money will be. After this tour ends there'll be no doubt who's the better man between me and Perry". Vines won the series 49–35. In November, Vines and Perry toured South and Central America and won four matches each. Vines was ranked World No. 1 pro by Bowers.

1939
In 1939 Vines lost his world pro crown to Don Budge but narrowly: in their first pro tour against each other, Vines trailed Budge 17–22.  The tour proved that at his best Vines was unbeatable, but also that Budge's consistency would prevail a majority of the time, making the latter the best player of the time. Touring Europe with Tilden and Stoefen in the summer, Budge won the tour and beat Vines more comfortably than he had done in the World Series.  Vines lost in the final at Roland Garros to Budge. At the knock-out event at Southport, Vines lost in the semi finals to Nusslein. Vines, by now, was losing interest in tennis and was turning his attention more and more to golf. His final title came at the US Pro, where he beat Perry in the final in four sets.

1940
In April 1940 Vines, at 28 years old, played his last tennis competition at the West Coast professional tennis tournament in Los Angeles. His physical problems, his desire to enjoy family life, his loss of the world crown, and above all his increasing passion for golf drove him to retire from tennis.

Vines' career earnings as of May 1938 were reported to be $185,000.

Abilities
Comparing Vines and Fred Perry after the 1939 tours, Don Budge wrote,

In 1975, Budge ranked his top five players of all-time and rated Vines number one. He also said Vines had the best serve. 

In 1983, Fred Perry ranked the greatest male players of all time and put them in to two categories, before World War 2 and after. Perry's pre-WWII nominees all below Tilden and excluding himself "Budge, Cochet, Ellsworth Vines 'so powerful!', Gottfried von Cramm, Jack Crawford, Jari Sato, Jean Borotra, Bunny Austin, Roderick Menzel, Baron Umberto de Morpurgo".

In the opinion of Jack Kramer, Vines was, along with Don Budge, one of the two greatest players who ever lived. Budge was consistently the best, according to Kramer's 1979 autobiography, but, at the very top of his game, Vines was unbeatable by anyone:

Tall and thin, Vines possessed a game with no noticeable weaknesses, except, according to Kramer, because of his great natural athletic ability, laziness.  He was particularly known for his powerful forehand and his very fast serve, both of which he generally hit absolutely flat with no spin. Although he could play the serve-and-volley game, he generally played an all-court game, preferring to hit winners from the baseline. Playing in the white flannel trousers that were standard dress for the time, he greatly impressed the youthful Kramer in a 1935 match in Southern California:

Kramer made up his mind on the spot to concentrate on tennis. Vines had, according to Kramer,

 (NOTE: The school's official all-time roster does not list him; however, this does not mean that Vines did not earn a basketball scholarship.)

In his chapter on 1932, Bud Collins writes in Total Tennis: The Ultimate Tennis Encyclopedia that Vines:

Collins goes on to say that:

After becoming bored with tennis while only in his late twenties, Vines became a professional golfer in 1942 and over the years had a number of high finishes in tournaments, including at least two professional victories (1946 Massachusetts Open, 1955 Utah Open) and a semifinal position in the prestigious 1951 PGA Championship when it was a match play tournament. Writes Kramer,

He compares Vines to another great tennis player, Lew Hoad:

Vines was inducted into the International Tennis Hall of Fame in Newport, Rhode Island in 1962.

In 100 Greatest of All Time, a 2012 television series broadcast by the Tennis Channel, Vines was ranked the 37th greatest male player, just behind Australian Lleyton Hewitt at 36th, and just ahead of Pancho Segura at 38th. Vines' contemporary rivals were also included in the list, Perry (a player whom Vines had beaten in two pro championship tours) was ranked at 15th, Cochet was ranked at 27th, and Crawford was ranked at 32nd.

Tennis

Major finals

Grand Slam tournaments

Singles (3 titles, 1 runner-up)

Doubles (2 titles)

Pro Slam tournaments

Singles (4 titles, 1 runner-up)

Singles performance timeline
Vines was banned from competing in the amateur Grand Slams when he joined the professional tennis circuit in 1934.

Golf

Tournament wins
1946 Massachusetts Open
1951 Southern California PGA Championship
1955 Utah Open

Results in major championships

Note: Vines did not play in The Open Championship.

NT = no tournament
"T" indicates a tie for a place
R64, R32, R16, QF, SF = round in which player lost in match play

Source for The Masters: www.masters.com

Source for U.S. Open and U.S. Amateur: USGA Championship Database

Source for PGA Championship: PGA Championship Media Guide

Source for 1939 Amateur Championship: The Glasgow Herald, May 26, 1939, pg. 21.

See also

 Frank Conner and G. H. "Pete" Bostwick Jr. are the only other men to have competed in the U.S. Open in both tennis and golf
 List of male tennis players

Notes

References

Sources
 The Game, My 40 Years in Tennis (1979), Jack Kramer with Frank Deford
 Total Tennis: The Ultimate Tennis Encyclopedia (2003), by Bud Collins
 How to Play Tennis (1933), by Mercer Beasley
 Tennis, Myth and Method (1978), by Ellesworth Vines
 Los Angeles Tennis Club

External links

 
 
 
 

American male golfers
American male tennis players
American men's basketball players
Australian Championships (tennis) champions
Golfers from Los Angeles
Grand Slam (tennis) champions in men's doubles
Grand Slam (tennis) champions in men's singles
Grand Slam (tennis) champions in mixed doubles
International Tennis Hall of Fame inductees
PGA Tour golfers
Professional tennis players before the Open Era
Tennis players from Los Angeles
Basketball players from Los Angeles
United States National champions (tennis)
USC Trojans men's basketball players 
Wimbledon champions (pre-Open Era)
World number 1 ranked male tennis players
1911 births
1994 deaths